Cicero–North Syracuse High School is an American public high school located in Cicero, New York, United States serving tenth through twelfth grade students. The school is part of the North Syracuse Central School District.

Overview
Cicero–North Syracuse High School hosts grades 10–12 and serves approximately 1,800 students. The school principal (interim) is Jamie Sullivan. Cicero–North Syracuse High School is often called C–NS. C–NS hosts many extracurricular activities, such as student clubs and sports teams. C–NS is the home of the Cicero–North Syracuse "Northstars" Marching Band. The school hosts about twenty co-ed sports, with New York State Championship titles in men's cross-country running in 1989, 1995, and 1996, and in girls softball in 1989, 1999, 2004, 2006 and 2013.

In 1993, the marching band won the Bowl Games of America national championship and in 1994 won the New England Scholastic Band Association championship.

In 2006, CNS won the Syracuse Area Live Theater Youth (S.A.L.T.Y.) award for best High School Musical with their performance of "The Music Man" During the 2006-2007 school year, the school has hosted two school wide summits, one focusing on dress code.

In 2009, the Cicero–North Syracuse High School Varsity Winterguard were crowned as the WGI SA Class Champions, winning the National Title for the first time, with a nearly perfect score of 97.4. They received a Perfect Score in the Movement Caption. In 2017 the Junior Varsity took first place in the Mid York Color Guard Circuit in the class SA2. The varsity team took first in Scholastic Open and received the bronze medal at WGI World Championships in Dayton OH. These achievements boosted the Varsity Winterguard to the Scholastic World class.

In 2009, a math teacher at Cicero–North Syracuse was accused of robbing a bank at gunpoint. He was previously arrested for stolen license plates. He was sentenced to 4 years in jail.

In 2010, the Boys and Girls varsity basketball teams became Section 3 champions for the first time in school history.

In 2016 and 2017 the Marching Band won the Large School 2 state championships for the New York State Field Band Conference. This was the first championship win for the band in 29 years. Also in 2017, the band won the USBands 5A National Championship in Allentown, Pennsylvania. The group also performed in the 2018 Macy's Thanksgiving Day Parade. In 2022, the band led an undefeated in-state season, taking home 1st place in the national class with a score of 96.8. The band traveled to the USBands Open Class National Championship in New Jersey and received 3rd place with a score of 94.0.

Notable alumni
Tyvon Branch (2004), professional football player
Josh Burke (2012), guitarist for The Red Jumpsuit Apparatus
Mark Copani (1998), professional wrestler in the WWE as "Muhammad Hassan"
Patrick Corbin (2007), professional baseball player
Richard Gere (North Syracuse 1967), actor
Dave Giusti (1957), professional baseball player
Curtis Johnson (2003), professional football player
J. R. Johnson (1998), professional football player
Beth Mowins (1985), ESPN play-by-play announcer and sports journalist
Dan Pepicelli (1985), college baseball coach
Breanna Stewart (2012), professional basketball player, Olympic Gold Medalist
Maury Youmans (1955), professional football player

References

External links
Official website

Public high schools in New York (state)
Schools in Onondaga County, New York
1967 establishments in New York (state)
Educational institutions established in 1967